Oristano-Fenosu Airport  is a small regional airport in central western Sardinia, Italy. It is only available to general aviation, and has no commercial flights, though it was the home base of the short-lived FlyOristano.

Airports in Sardinia
Province of Oristano